Epping railway station is located on the Mernda line in Victoria, Australia. It serves the northern Melbourne suburb of Epping, and it opened on 23 December 1889.

History

Epping originally opened as a station on the line to Whittlesea, with services to the station operating as country services. From 1924, an AEC railmotor shuttle service operated from Reservoir to Whittlesea, until the line was closed north of Lalor on 29 November 1959.

On 30 November 1964, a new station opened a little further down the line, as part of the electrification of the line from Lalor to Epping. The station building was relocated from Glen Waverley, which was being rebuilt at the time. On 1 January 1971, the building was damaged by a deliberately lit fire.

During the late 1980s, the station was rebuilt, in conjunction with the construction of the adjacent train depot, with the north face of the former ground level island platform brought into use in July 1987, along with temporary station buildings. The new platform was built on a new alignment, with 200 metres of new track needed to link to the existing line. The former platform and station building from 1964 were demolished by late July 1987, along with the former alignment of the track and overhead wiring. The south face of the former ground level island platform (Platform 1) was brought into use 9 months later, in April 1988. The new Solid State Interlocking was commissioned in 1989, and was the first fully computerised system in Melbourne.

In 1990, the suburban train depot opened, and was built as a replacement for the Jolimont Workshops in central Melbourne. The depot covers 10.8 hectares, and can accommodate 31 trains, with the facility including a main workshop building, four elevated tracks, two lifting tracks, and a train wash. On 23 July 1998, Epping was upgraded to a Premium Station.

At around 09:14 on 18 June 2002, two Comeng train sets collided approximately 1km south of the station.

In 2010, construction commenced on a new island platform north of Cooper Street, built below ground level, as part of a grade separation project and in conjunction with the duplication of the line from Keon Park, and its extension to South Morang. On 28 November 2011, the new station opened. The former ground level island platform and building was demolished soon after and, in early 2012, a number of stabling sidings built on its site.

Facilities, platforms and services

Epping has one island platform with two faces. Access to the platforms is provided by stairs and a lift. The station concourse contains a customer service window, an enclosed waiting room, toilets and a kiosk.

It is serviced by Metro Trains' Mernda line services.

Platform 1:
  all stations and limited stops services to Flinders Street

Platform 2:
  all stations services to Mernda

Transport links

Dysons operates six routes via Epping station, under contract to Public Transport Victoria:
 : to Wollert East
 : Wollert West – Thomastown station
 : to Wollert
 : Pacific Epping – Northland Shopping Centre
 : Pacific Epping – South Morang station
 : Pacific Epping – South Morang station

Kinetic Melbourne operates one SmartBus route via Epping station, under contract to Public Transport Victoria:
  : Frankston station – Melbourne Airport

Gallery

References

External links
 
 South Morang extension project gallery
 Melway map at street-directory.com.au
 Station Information at Vicsig

Premium Melbourne railway stations
Railway stations in Melbourne
Railway stations in Australia opened in 1889
Railway stations in the City of Whittlesea